Kandivali (Pronunciation: [kaːn̪d̪iʋəliː]; formerly Khandolee, station code: KLE) is a railway station on the Western line of the Mumbai Suburban Railway network. It serves the Kandivli neighbourhood of Mumbai, India. All slow local trains temporarily halt between Kandivali and Borivali for a few seconds for signaling purposes, which commuters call an imaginary station named Thambevali.

In 2020, during the COVID-19 crisis, Children's Academy along with Project Mumbai undertook a beautification project for Kandivali railway station. Murals of Mandala art were drawn onto the walls of the station. Covid warriors were artistically portrayed on Platform 4.

Platforms
Platform 1 caters mostly to Borivali, Bhayandar, Vasai Road, Nalla Sopara and Virar bound slow trains.
Platform 2 caters to Andheri, Bandra, Dadar and Churchgate bound slow and semi fast trains.
Platform 3 is very less used and caters to Bhayandar bound slow trains.
Platform 4 is also very less used and mostly caters to Churchgate bound semi fast trains and Andheri bound slow trains. It is also used by a Bhayandar bound fast train which has a halt at Kandivali.

References

Railway stations in Mumbai Suburban district
Mumbai Suburban Railway stations
Mumbai WR railway division